Sonnino is an Italian surname. Notable people with the surname include:

 Sidney Sonnino (1847–1922), Italian statesman 
 Giorgio Sonnino (1844–1921), a senator of the Kingdom of Italy

See also
 Sonnino
 Sonnino I Cabinet
 Sonnino II Cabinet

Italian-language surnames